This is a list of the main career statistics of retired French tennis player Marion Bartoli. Bartoli reached a career-high singles ranking of No. 7 in the world on 30 January 2012, and won the women's singles title at the 2013 Wimbledon Championships. Overall, Bartoli won eight singles titles and three doubles titles on the WTA Tour.

Performance timelines
Only main-draw results in WTA Tour, Grand Slam tournaments, Fed Cup and Olympic Games are included in win–loss records.

Singles

Doubles

Significant finals

Grand Slam tournamentss

Singles: 2 (1 title, 1 runner-up)

WTA Tournament of Champions

Singles: 1 (runner-up)

WTA Premier Mandatory & 5 finals

Singles: 1 (runner-up)

WTA career finals

Singles: 19 (8 titles, 11 runner-ups)

Doubles: 7 (3 titles, 4 runner-ups)

ITF Circuit finals

Singles: 6 titles

Doubles: 2 (1 title, 1 runner-up)

Best Grand Slam results details
Grand Slam winners are in boldface, and runner-ups are in italics.

WTA Tour career earnings
Bartoli earned more than 11 million dollars during her career.

Head-to-head records

Record against top 10 players
Bartoli's record against players who have been ranked in the top 10. Active players are in boldface.

No. 1 wins

Top 10 wins

Notes

References

Bartoli, Marion